Alain Nurenberg (born 23 March 1961) is a retired Luxembourgian football midfielder.

References

1961 births
Living people
Luxembourgian footballers
FC Progrès Niederkorn players
Association football midfielders
Luxembourg international footballers